Harry Järv (27 March 1921 – 21 December 2009) was a Finland Swedish librarian, author and translator. He was a lieutenant ranked veteran of World War II. By his political views Järv was an anarcho-syndicalist.

Early years and wartime 
Järv was born in a farmer's family in Western Finnish municipality of Korsholm. After graduating from high school in Vaasa, Järv went to sea at the age of 18. As the Winter War broke out in November 1939 he enlisted in the Finnish Army as a volunteer. Later at World War II Järv was a platoon leader in the 61st Infantry Regiment that consisted almost exclusively of Swedish-speaking Finns. He was a member of patrol unit, leading recon and combat patrols behind the enemy lines. In September 1943 Järv was seriously wounded by a landmine and he spent the rest of the war at Saint Göran Hospital in Stockholm.

Järv carried a camera through the war and took a plenty of pictures that were later published in his books. The 2004 Finnish war film Beyond the Front Line is based on Järv's diaries. In 1945 Järv helped his former superior Alpo Marttinen flee Finland to Sweden, although Järv said he didn't like Marttinen as a person. Colonel Marttinen, who later joined the United States Army, was involved with the Weapons Cache Case.

Later years 
After the war was over, Järv received a scholarship from Uppsala University and moved to Sweden where he spent the rest of his life. Järv had a great interest in reading and collecting books since his childhood. Järv's personal library had more than 14,000 copies. He worked as a librarian and later as a deputy director at the National Library of Sweden.

In 1973 Järv was awarded an Honorary degree by Uppsala University. He was also a member of the Royal Swedish Academy of Letters, History and Antiquities. Järv wrote and translated more than 50 books as well as dozens of articles in various publications. His own books were mostly an essay collections of Ancient history, politics and philosophy. Järv was the editor-in-chief in Swedish culture magazines Horisont, Radix and Fenix and was known as an eminent expert on Franz Kafka.

Political ideas 
Järv was first introduced to anarchist ideas as a teenager by the books of Peter Kropotkin. On his time at the sea Järv was influenced by Finnish syndicalist Niilo Wälläri who was the leader of Finnish Seamen's Union. During the war Järv suited anarchist ideas on his role as a platoon leader. Järv treated his men equally to himself and the decisions were made democratically. This often led to conflicts with his superior officers and Järv was considered as "unmilitary". In 1952 Järv joined the Swedish anarcho-syndicalist union SAC and started writing articles in its newspaper Arbetaren.

Honours 
Order of the Cross of Liberty – 1939–1944
Honorary degree of Philosophy, Uppsala University – 1973

Awards 
Svenska Akademiens översättarpris – 1969
Elsa Thulins översättarpris – 1976
Lotten von Kræmers pris – 1986
Längmanska kulturfondens pris – 2001
Kellgrenpriset – 2007

Books 
Nikolaj Leskov och det ryska samhället (1950)
Kritik av den nya kritiken (1953)
Klassisk horisont (1960)
Introduktion till Kafka (1962)
Vreden som brann hos peliden Achilleus (1962)
Varaktigare än koppar (1962)
Betydande böcker från vå regen tid (1966)
Läsarmekanismer (1971)
Frihet jämlikhet konstnärskap (1974)
Ezra Pound, Litterära essäer (1975)
Victor Svanberg (1976)
Tycke och smak (1978)
Konst och kvalitet (1979)
Enfald eller mångfald (1982)
Den svenska boken 500 år (1983)
Vinghästen (1984)
Trollkarl eller lärling, Atlantis (1986)
Den "goda tvåans" paradoxala hemlighet (1991)
Kunskapens träd (1991)
Om judiska bidrag till svensk kultur (1992)
Aktualiteter i historiskt perspektiv (1995)
Prometheus' eld (1998)
Åsikter och avsikter (2002)
Oavgjort i två krig (2006)

References 

1921 births
2009 deaths
People from Korsholm
Swedish-speaking Finns
Finnish military personnel of World War II
Recipients of the Order of the Cross of Liberty
Finnish anarchists
Finnish emigrants to Sweden
Swedish librarians
Swedish translators
Swedish essayists
20th-century Swedish historians
Swedish anarchists
Uppsala University alumni
Members of the Royal Swedish Academy of Letters, History and Antiquities
20th-century translators
Male essayists
20th-century essayists
20th-century Swedish male writers
Anarcho-syndicalists